Bánh cáy is a variety of Vietnamese bánh (translates loosely as "cake" or "bread") made in the Thái Bình Province of northern Vietnam. It is made of sticky rice, sugar, gac or gardenia, sesame, carrots, mandarin orange peel, and lard. The mixture is roasted and ground, then put into a square box. It resembles the eggs of the con cáy, a small crab in northern Vietnam which lives in rivers and rice paddies, from which this bánh derives its name. Bánh cáy is traditionally served with tea.

Vietnamese pastries
Bánh